In silico is an expression meaning "performed on computer or via computer simulation".

In silico may also refer to:

 In Silico (Deepsky album), 2002
 In Silico (Pendulum album), 2008

See also 
 Insilico Medicine, a biotechnology company
 In silico medicine
 In silico clinical trials
 In silico PCR
 Insilicos, a software company